Anna Gostomelsky (born 9 June 1981) is an Israeli swimmer who represented Israel at the 2004 and 2008 Summer Olympics.

Biography
Gostomelsky was born to a Jewish family in Kiev, Soviet Union (now Ukraine). She immigrated to Israel with her family at age 10. She holds the most Israeli swimming records of any female swimmer.

She competed on behalf of Israel at the 2004 Summer Olympics, in Athens, Greece, and Israel at the 2008 Summer Olympics in Beijing, China.

At the 2005 Maccabiah Games, she won the women's 100m freestyle and set a new Maccabiah record.

References

External links
 

1981 births
Living people
Ukrainian Jews
Ukrainian emigrants to Israel
Israeli Jews
Jewish swimmers
Israeli female swimmers
Olympic swimmers of Israel
Swimmers at the 2004 Summer Olympics
Swimmers at the 2008 Summer Olympics
Maccabiah Games medalists in swimming
Maccabiah Games gold medalists for Israel
Competitors at the 2005 Maccabiah Games